Muhammad Abdul Gafur is a politician of Rajshahi District, Bangladesh and former member of parliament for Rajshahi-3 constituency in February 1996.

Political life 
Abdul Gafur is the senior vice president of Rajshahi District Bangladesh Nationalist Party. He was elected to parliament from Rajshahi-3 as a Bangladesh Nationalist Party candidate in 15 February 1996 Bangladeshi general election. He lost the Rajshahi-4 constituency in the ninth general election in 2008.

References 

Living people
Year of birth missing (living people)
People from Rajshahi District
Bangladesh Nationalist Party politicians
6th Jatiya Sangsad members